Nistor Şandro (born 17 September 1974) is a Romanian gymnast. He competed at the 1996 Summer Olympics.

References

External links
 

1974 births
Living people
Romanian male artistic gymnasts
Olympic gymnasts of Romania
Gymnasts at the 1996 Summer Olympics
Sportspeople from Oradea